The Supreme Soviet of the Estonian SSR (Estonian: Eesti NSV Ülemnõukogu) was the rubber stamp "legislative assembly" of the Estonian SSR – an administrative subunit of the Soviet Union in 1940–1991. After its first democratic elections on 18 March 1990, the institution was renamed the Supreme Council of the Republic of Estonia on 8 May 1990.

Organization 
The structure and formal functions of the Supreme Soviet of the Estonian SSR were copied from the Supreme Soviet of the Soviet Union. The sessions of the Supreme Soviet lasted only several days twice a year and decisions were made unanimously and without much discussion. Supreme Soviet elections were irregular until 1975 and were held every five years in 1975–1985. The Supreme Soviet gathered in Tallinn, in the Toompea Castle building which now houses the Riigikogu.

Chairmen of the Supreme Soviet

Presidents of the Presidium of the Supreme Soviet 
The presidium was the permanent body of the Supreme Soviet. Its chairman was the de jure head of state.

The chairmen of the presidium were:

Convocations 

 1st convocation (1940–1946)
 2nd convocation (1947–1950)
 3rd convocation (1951–1954)
 4th convocation (1955–1959)
 5th convocation (1959–1962)
 6th convocation (1963–1966)
 7th convocation (1967–1970)
 8th convocation (1971–1975)
 9th convocation (1975–1979)
 10th convocation (1980–1984)
 11th convocation (1985–1990)
 12th convocation (1990–1992)

See also 

 Estonian Sovereignty Declaration
 Supreme Soviet of the Soviet Union
 Riigikogu

Notes

References

Government of Estonia
Historical legislatures
Estonian Soviet Socialist Republic
1940 establishments in Estonia
1990s disestablishments in Estonia
Defunct unicameral legislatures
estonian